Mohamed Khairy (born 1919) was an Egyptian equestrian. He competed in two events at the 1952 Summer Olympics. These events were Team Jumping and Individual Jumping.

References

External links
 

1919 births
Possibly living people
Egyptian male equestrians
Olympic equestrians of Egypt
Equestrians at the 1952 Summer Olympics
Place of birth missing (living people)